Paraíso is a municipality in the state of São Paulo , Brazil. Its population is 6,496 (2020 est.), and its area 155 km². Its elevation is 598 m.

References

Municipalities in São Paulo (state)